Psorotheciopsis is a genus of lichenized fungi within the Gomphillaceae family.

References

Ostropales
Lichen genera
Ostropales genera
Taxa named by Heinrich Rehm